Saint-Just-sur-Dive (literally Saint Just on Dive) is a commune in the Maine-et-Loire department in western France. It is around 50 km west of Tours, in the Loire–Anjou–Touraine regional nature park.

See also
 Thouet river
 Communes of the Maine-et-Loire department

References

Saintjustsurdive